The Fifth Menzies ministry (Liberal–Country Coalition) was the 35th ministry of the Government of Australia. It was led by the country's 12th Prime Minister, Robert Menzies. The Fifth Menzies ministry succeeded the Fourth Menzies ministry, which dissolved on 11 May 1951 following the federal election that took place in April. The ministry was replaced by the Sixth Menzies ministry on 9 July 1954 following the 1954 federal election.

Paul Hasluck, who died in 1993, was the last surviving member of the Fifth Menzies Ministry; Hasluck was also the last surviving member of the Sixth Menzies ministry. John McEwen was the last surviving Country minister.

Ministry

Notes

Ministries of George VI
Ministries of Elizabeth II
Menzies, 05
1951 establishments in Australia
1954 disestablishments in Australia
Robert Menzies
Cabinets established in 1951
Cabinets disestablished in 1954